Andrew Paul Ordon, M.D., F.A.C.S., ABPS, ASPS, sometimes billed as Dr. Drew Ordon, (born December 9, 1950) is an American plastic surgeon and an Emmy-nominated co-host of the award-winning talk show The Doctors.

Medical career

Education
Ordon was born in Chicago and raised in Long Beach, California. He graduated with a bachelor's degree from the University of California, Irvine in 1972 and received his medical degree from the University of Southern California School of Medicine (now the Keck School of Medicine of USC) in 1979. After a surgical internship at the Los Angeles County+USC Medical Center, Ordon completed residencies at LAC+USC Medical Center as well as White Memorial Medical Center in Los Angeles and Lenox Hill Hospital in New York City. Ordon completed his fellowship in Aesthetic Surgery at the Beverly Hills Medical Center.

Certifications
Ordon is a diplomate of the American Board of Plastic Surgery, the American Board of Otolaryngology, the American Board of Cosmetic Surgery and the National Board of Medical Examiners. Ordon is affiliated with Cedars-Sinai Medical Center in Los Angeles and Eisenhower Medical Center in Rancho Mirage, California. He currently practices in Beverly Hills and Rancho Mirage, California.

Academic appointments
Ordon is currently an assistant clinical professor of plastic surgery at the David Geffen School of Medicine at UCLA in Los Angeles, Associate Professor of Surgery at the Keck/USC School of Medicine and at Dartmouth Medical School in Hanover, New Hampshire. He previously held faculty positions at the University of Connecticut Health Center and the New York Medical College.

Andrew Ordon is also co-director of the Keck/USC Aesthetic Fellowship.

Charity work
Ordon is a founding member of the Surgical Friends Foundation, a non-profit organization that provides free surgical procedures to burn victims, abuse victims, people born with birth defects and others who cannot otherwise afford needed reconstructive surgery in the US and countries including Jordan and Haiti. Ordon has also worked with Smile Train, providing cleft lip and palate repairs.

Television
Ordon's television appearances as a medical and plastic surgery expert date back to the 1980s. In 2007 he became a regular guest of Dr. Phil McGraw on the Dr. Phil talk show. In 2008 Ordon was selected by McGraw as a host for The Doctors, a talk show produced by McGraw. On The Doctors Ordon discusses plastic surgery as well as skin care, anti-aging techniques and other well-being topics. The program is syndicated in over 140 countries, has taped about 1200 episodes, and reaches an average 1.15 million daily viewers in the US. The show has been nominated for a Daytime Emmy Award six times, winning for Outstanding Talk Show/Informative in 2010. Ordon, together with his co-hosts, received Outstanding Talk Show Host nominations in 2011 and 2012.

Other recent television appearances made by Ordon include the Daytime Emmy Awards, the Rachael Ray Show, The Early Show, The Wendy Williams Show, Studio One and on the Fox News Channel, and a guest appearance on the Adult Swim faux talk show, The Eric Andre Show.

Diet book

Personal life
, he was married to a former Wilhelmina model and lived in Los Angeles and Rancho Mirage, California, and had two children. , son Matt was a neurosurgery resident in Chicago. , daughter Shannon was a psychiatry resident in California.

In 2011, a Golden Palm Star on the Palm Springs, California, Walk of Stars was dedicated to him.

References

1950 births
American plastic surgeons
Keck School of Medicine of USC alumni
Living people
People from Long Beach, California
People from Rancho Mirage, California
University of California, Irvine alumni